Red Wheel Weiser Conari, also known in different periods in its history as RedWheel/Weiser, LLC and Samuel Weiser, Inc., is a book publisher with three imprints: Red Wheel, Weiser Books and Conari Books. It is America's second-largest publisher of occult and New Age books, behind Llewellyn Worldwide, and is also one of the oldest American publishers to concentrate exclusively on that genre. It publishes on average 60-75 new titles per year and maintains a large backlist, partly of books that it originally published, and partly of older public domain rare occult books.

Imprints

Weiser Books
This main imprint is also the oldest. It was founded as Samuel Weiser, Inc. in 1956, a time when few other publishers were willing to tackle occult subjects, and was originally an offshoot of the New York City retailer, Weiser Antiquarian Books. This imprint publishes the backlist and continues to acquire books on occultism, astrology, esoteric subjects, Eastern religions, Wicca and related topics.

Red Wheel
Red Wheel was founded in 2000 as an imprint for spiritually oriented or occult self-help and how-to books, and at that time the company name was changed from Samuel Weiser, Inc. to RedWheel/Weiser, with several other variations being commonly seen, including Weiser, Inc.

Conari Books
This imprint was acquired in 2002. Before this, Conari Books had been a separate publisher, based in Berkeley, California, dating back to 1989. This imprint focuses on books that view sociology and parenting issues through a spiritual or New Age perspective.

Turning Stone Press
Turning Stone was founded in 2012. It is a self-publishing imprint in collaboration with Hampton Roads Publishing Company and Hierophant Publishing.

Disinformation Books
Disinformation Books was founded in 1997 as the publishing division of Disinformation. It was acquired by Red Wheel/Weiser in 2012.

Career Press
Career Press was founded in 1985 by Ron Fry and is focused on business books. Red Wheel/Weiser acquired Career Press in 2017.

New Page Books
New Page Books was founded in 1999 as the general nonfiction imprint of Career Press.

Location
The company has been previously located in Boston and in York Beach, Maine for most of its history. In 2006, the editorial department moved to San Francisco and the sales and marketing department moved to Newburyport, Massachusetts.

Famous authors
Aleister Crowley
Dion Fortune
Eliphas Levi
S.L. MacGregor Mathers
Arthur Edward Waite

Notes

References
2007 Writer's Market, Robert Lee Brewer & Joanna Masterson. (2006) 
Jeff Herman's Guide To Book Publishers, Editors & Literary Agents 2007, Jeff Herman. (2006)

External links
 

New Age literature
Modern pagan media
Book publishing companies based in Massachusetts
Occult books
Publishing companies established in 1956
Companies based in Newburyport, Massachusetts
American companies established in 1956